Pryor is a surname, which can refer to:
 Aaron Pryor (1955–2016), American boxer
 Anduele Pryor (born 1985), Dutch football player
 Arthur Pryor (1870–1942), American trombonist and bandleader
 Cactus Pryor (1923–2011), Texan humorist and broadcaster
 Charles Pryor (1815–1897), English cricketer
 David Pryor (born 1934),  American politician, former U.S. Senator from Arkansas, father of Mark Pryor
 DJ Pryor, American stand-up comedian and actor
 Francis Pryor (born 1945), British archaeologist
 Francis R. Pryor (1862–1937), English playwright
 Frederic Pryor (1933-2019), American economist
 Greg Pryor (born 1949), American baseball player
 James Pryor (born 1968), American philosopher
 Kendric Pryor (born 1998), American football player
 Lindsay Pryor (1915–1998), Australian botanist
 Mark Pryor (born 1963), American politician
 Matt Pryor (American football) (born 1994), American football player
 Michael Pryor (born 1957), Australian author
 Quentin Pryor (born 1983), American basketball player
 Richard Pryor (1940–2005), American comedian, actor, and writer
 Roger Atkinson Pryor (1828–1919), Virginia secessionist and New York state judge
 Ronald Pryor (1901–1977), Brazilian cricketer
 Snooky Pryor (1921–2006), Afro-American blues musician
 Terrelle Pryor (born 1989), American football player
 The fictional Pryor family from American Dreams

It may also refer to the following places:
 Pryor Creek, Oklahoma, a city commonly called Pryor
 Pryor, Colorado
 Pryor, Montana

See also
 Preyer
 Prior (surname)